Gerald Archibald Arbuthnot (19 December 1872 – 25 September 1916) was a British soldier and Conservative Party politician.

Early life 
The son of Major General William Arbuthnot and Selina Moncreiffe, he was vice-chancellor of the Primrose League.

Political career 
Arbuthnot was private secretary to the Board of Agriculture from 1895 to 1899, assistant private secretary to the President of the Local Government Board in 1901 and 1902 and assistant private secretary to the Chief Secretary for Ireland in 1905 and 1906. Between January and December 1910, he was Member of Parliament (MP) for Burnley.

Military service 
In the First World War, he served in the Grenadier Guards and reached the rank of second lieutenant, having been made a lieutenant in the service of the Royal Naval Volunteer Reserve already in 1914. He fought in the Battle of Ypres. Arbuthnot died aged 43, killed in action during the Battle of the Somme. He was buried at Citadel New Military Cemetery, Fricourt. In November 2018, Arbuthnot's name was added to the UK Parliament's World War One memorial, after a historian at the History of Parliament Trust noticed his name was missing.

Personal life 
He married (Mary Johanna) Dulcie Antoinette Oppenheim, daughter of Charles Augustus Oppenheim, on 6 February 1894. They had three daughters, one of whom, Cynthia Isabelle Theresa, married rower and financier Ian Fairbairn.

One of Arbuthnot's descendants, James Arbuthnot, served as Member of Parliament for Wanstead and Woodford from 1987 to 1997, and for North East Hampshire from 1997 to 2015.

References

External links

Commonwealth War Graves Commission

1872 births
1916 deaths
Burials in Hauts-de-France
Gerald Archibald Arbuthnott
Conservative Party (UK) MPs for English constituencies
UK MPs 1910
Grenadier Guards officers
Royal Navy officers of World War I
Civil servants in the Ministry of Agriculture, Fisheries and Food
Civil servants in the Local Government Board
Civil servants in Ireland (1801–1922)
Private secretaries in the British Civil Service
British Army personnel of World War I
British military personnel killed in the Battle of the Somme
Politics of Burnley
Royal Naval Volunteer Reserve personnel of World War I